USS Houston (CL/CA-30), was a  of the United States Navy. She was the second Navy ship to bear the name "Houston".

She was launched by Newport News Shipbuilding & Dry Dock Company, Newport News, Virginia, on 7 September 1929, sponsored by Elizabeth Holcombe (daughter of Oscar Holcombe, then-mayor of Houston, Texas), and commissioned on 17 June 1930, Captain Jesse Bishop Gay commanding.

The ship was originally classified as a light cruiser (hull number CL-30) because of her thin armor. Houston was redesignated a heavy cruiser (CA-30) on 1 July 1931, as the provisions of the 1930 London Naval Treaty considered ships with 8-inch (20.3 cm) main guns to be heavy cruisers.

Inter-war period
After conducting a shakedown cruise in the Atlantic, Houston returned to the United States in October 1930. She then visited her namesake city, and joined the fleet at Hampton Roads. Steaming to New York, the cruiser departed on 10 January 1931 for the Pacific, and after stopping at the Panama Canal and the Hawaiian Islands, arrived at Manila on 22 February. Houston became flagship of the Asiatic Fleet upon arrival, and for the next year participated in training operations in the Far East.

With the outbreak of war between China and Japan in 1931, Houston got underway on 31 January for Shanghai to protect American interests. The cruiser sailed to San Francisco to join the Scouting Force, and for the years preceding World War II participated in Fleet Problems and maneuvers in the Pacific.

During this period, Houston made several special cruises. President Franklin Roosevelt came aboard on 1 July 1934 at Annapolis, Maryland, for a cruise of almost  through the Caribbean and to Portland, Oregon, by way of Hawaii. Houston also carried Assistant Secretary of the Navy Henry L. Roosevelt on a tour of the Hawaiian Islands, returning to San Diego on 15 May 1935.

After a short cruise in Alaskan waters, the cruiser returned to Seattle and embarked the President again on 3 October for a vacation cruise to Cedros Island, Magdalena Bay, Cocos Islands, and Charleston, South Carolina. Houston also celebrated the opening of the Golden Gate Bridge at San Francisco on 28 May 1937, and carried President Roosevelt for a Fleet Review at the same city on 14 July 1938. Roosevelt's 24-day cruise aboard Houston concluded on 9 August 1938 at Pensacola, Florida.

Houston became flagship of the U.S. Fleet on 19 September, when Rear Admiral Claude C. Bloch brought his flag aboard, and maintained that status until 28 December, when she returned to the Scouting Force. Continuing the routine of training exercises, she got underway for Fleet Problem XX, on 4 January 1939 from San Francisco, sailed to Norfolk and Key West, and there embarked the President and the Chief of Naval Operations, Admiral William D. Leahy, for the duration of the exercise. She arrived in Houston on 7 April for a brief visit before returning to Seattle, where she arrived on 30 May.

Assigned as flagship of the Hawaiian Detachment, the cruiser arrived Pearl Harbor after her post-overhaul shakedown on 7 December 1939, and continued in that capacity until returning to Mare Island on 17 February 1940. Sailing to Hawaii, she departed for the Philippine Islands on 3 November. Arriving at Manila on 19 November, she became the flagship of Admiral Thomas C. Hart, Commander Asiatic Fleet.

Shortly before the war in the Pacific broke out, five quad-mount 1.1"/75 caliber antiaircraft cannons were shipped to Cavite Naval Yard in the Philippines; four of these were installed aboard Houston to increase the ship's air defense protection.

World War II
As the war crisis deepened, Admiral Hart deployed his fleet in readiness. On the night of the Pearl Harbor attack, Houston got underway from Panay Island with fleet units bound for Darwin, Australia, where she arrived on 28 December 1941 by way of Balikpapan and Surabaya. After patrol duty, she joined the American-British-Dutch-Australian (ABDA) naval force at Surabaya.

Battle of Makassar Strait

Air raids were frequent in the area, and Houstons gunners shot down four Japanese planes in the Battle of Bali Sea (also known as the Battle of Makassar Strait) on 4 February 1942, as Admiral Karel Doorman of the Royal Netherlands Navy took his force to engage Japanese reported to be at Balikpapan. Houston took one hit, disabling the number three turret, and the cruiser  was so damaged that she had to be sent out of the battle area. Doorman was forced to abandon his advance.

Timor Convoy

Houston arrived at Tjilatjap 5 February and stayed until 10 February, when she left for Darwin to escort a convoy carrying troops to reinforce forces already defending Timor. By eleven in the morning, the convoy was being shadowed by a Japanese flying boat that dropped some bombs without causing damage before departing. The next morning another shadowing aircraft had taken position, and before noon the convoy was attacked by bombers and flying boats in two waves. During the first attack, Mauna Loa suffered slight damage and two casualties, one killed and one wounded. Houstons fire showed no effects. During the second attack, Houston distinguished herself with a barrage which made her "like a sheet of flame" shooting down 7 of the 44 planes of the second wave. The convoy continued toward Timor for a few hours, with Houston launching a scout plane seeking the enemy position. ABDA suspected the presence of Japanese carriers, an imminent invasion of Timor, and a support fleet lying in wait and thus ordered the convoy back to Darwin, which it reached before noon on 18 February.

Houston and Peary departed later that day to rejoin combat forces at Tjilatjap. Shortly after departure, Peary broke off to chase a suspected submarine, and expended so much fuel in doing so that the destroyer returned to Darwin instead of continuing with Houston. Houston thus escaped the Japanese attack on Darwin on 19 February, in which Peary, Meigs and Mauna Loa were among the ships sunk and Portmar was forced to beach.

Battle of the Java Sea

Receiving word that the major Japanese invasion force was approaching Java protected by a formidable surface unit, Admiral Doorman decided to meet and seek to destroy the main convoy. Sailing on 26 February 1942 with the cruisers Houston, HNLMS Java and ten destroyers, he met the Japanese support force under Admiral Takeo Takagi consisting of four cruisers and 13 destroyers in the late afternoon of 27 February 1942. As Japanese destroyers laid a smokescreen, the cruisers of both fleets opened fire. After one ineffective torpedo attack, the Japanese light cruisers and destroyers launched a second and sank the destroyer . HMS Exeter and the destroyer  were hit by gunfire, Electra sinking shortly after. At 17:30, Admiral Doorman turned south toward the Java coast, not wishing to be diverted from his main purpose of destroying the convoy.

The Allied fleet dodged another torpedo attack and followed the coastline, during which time the destroyer  was sunk, either by mine or internal explosion. The destroyer  was detached to pick up survivors from Kortenaer, and the American destroyers were ordered back to Surabaya as they had fired all their torpedoes. With no destroyer protection, Doorman's four remaining ships turned north again in a last attempt to stop the invasion of Java. At 23:00, the cruisers again encountered the Japanese surface group. Sailing on parallel courses, the opposing units opened fire, and the Japanese launched a torpedo attack 30 minutes later. De Ruyter and Java were caught in a spread of 12 torpedoes, which resulted in their destruction. Before De Ruyter sank, Doorman ordered Houston and Perth to retire to Tanjong Priok.

Two cruisers and three destroyers of the ABDA naval force were sunk, the cruiser Exeter had been damaged, and the remaining ships were ordered back to Surabaya and Tanjong Priok.

Battle of Sunda Strait

Houston and Perth reached Tanjong Priok on 28 February, where they attempted to resupply, but were met with fuel shortages and no available ammunition. The two cruisers were ordered to sail to Tjilatjap with Dutch destroyer , but departed at 17:00 without Evertsen, which was delayed. At 23:06, the two cruisers were off St. Nicholas Point when lookouts on Perth sighted an unidentified ship; when it was realized that she was a Japanese destroyer, Perth engaged. However, as this happened, multiple Japanese warships appeared and surrounded the two Allied ships.

The two cruisers evaded the nine torpedoes launched by the destroyer . At midnight, Perth attempted to force a way through the destroyers, but was hit by four torpedoes in the space of a few minutes, then subject to close-range gunfire until sinking at 00:25 on 1 March.

On board Houston, shells were in short supply in the forward turrets, so the crew manhandled shells from the disabled number three turret to the forward turrets. Houston was struck by a torpedo shortly after midnight, and began to lose headway. Houstons gunners had scored hits on three different destroyers and sunk a minesweeper, but she was struck by three more torpedoes in quick succession. Captain Albert Rooks was killed by a bursting shell at 00:30, and as the ship came to a stop, Japanese destroyers moved in, machine-gunning the decks and men in the water. A few minutes later, Houston rolled over and sank. Of the 1,061 aboard, 368 survived, including 24 of the 74-man Marine Detachment, only to be captured by the Japanese and interned in prison camps. Of 368 Navy and Marine Corps personnel taken prisoner, 77 (21%) died in captivity.

Aftermath

Houstons fate was not fully known by the world for almost nine months, and the full story of her last fight was not told until the survivors were liberated from prison camps at the end of the war. Before then, on 30 May 1942, 1,000 new recruits for the Navy, known as the Houston Volunteers, were sworn in at a dedication ceremony in downtown Houston, to replace those believed lost on Houston. On 12 October 1942 the light cruiser Vicksburg (CL-81), then under construction, was renamed Houston in honor of the old ship, President Roosevelt declaring:

Captain Rooks received posthumously the Medal of Honor for his actions. Chaplain George S. Rentz, who had surrendered his life jacket to a younger sailor after finding himself in the water, was posthumously awarded the Navy Cross. He was the only Navy Chaplain to be so honored during World War II.

The crew of Houston is honored alongside that of Perth at the Shrine of Remembrance in Melbourne, Australia, and in St John's Anglican Church, Fremantle.

The wreck
In a training evolution conducted as part of the Cooperation Afloat Readiness and Training (CARAT) 2014 exercise series, U.S. Navy divers, assisted by personnel from the Indonesian Navy, surveyed what they believed to be the wreck of Houston in June 2014. The purpose of the mission was to determine the vessel's condition and provide real-world training to rescue-and-salvage divers in maneuvering around a sunken ship. The formal report was released in August 2014 and confirmed that the wreck is indeed that of Houston. The report also stated that the wreck had suffered illegal salvage over the years, including removal of rivets and a steel plate from the hull. The investigation also recorded active oil seepage from the ship's fuel tanks. Another survey of Houston occurred in October 2015, with United States Navy and Indonesian Navy divers embarked aboard  for a nine-day survey of Houston and Perth (which had also been subject to unauthorized salvaging). Divers documented the condition of the two shipwrecks, with this data presented to a conference in Jakarta on preserving and preventing the illegal salvage of wartime shipwrecks in the Java Sea.

Awards

Presidential Unit Citation
American Defense Service Medal with "FLEET" clasp
Asiatic-Pacific Campaign Medal with two battle stars
World War II Victory Medal

Notes

References

Bibliography

External links

USS Houston homepage
 A Collection of Biographies and Photographs of those of Served aboard the USS Houston CA30 USS Houston Next Generation
Navy photographs of Houston (CA-30) 

The USS Houston Bluebonnet Newsletter Collection (1933–1941)
Field Report: 2014 USS Houston (CA-30) DIVEX, 10 November 2014.

Northampton-class cruisers
World War II cruisers of the United States
World War II shipwrecks in the Java Sea
1929 ships
Ships built in Newport News, Virginia
Maritime incidents in March 1942